Rishi Chopra (born 18 December 1995) is an Irish cricketer. He made his Twenty20 debut for North West Warriors in the 2018 Inter-Provincial Trophy on 6 July 2018.

References

External links
 

1995 births
Living people
Irish cricketers
Place of birth missing (living people)
North West Warriors cricketers
Irish people of Indian descent